Jonathan Andrew "Jon" Hesse (born June 6, 1973) is a former professional American football linebacker in the National Football League. He was the 7th round draft pick (#221 overall) of the Jacksonville Jaguars in the 1997 NFL Draft. He would play linebacker with the St. Louis Rams in 1998. He also was included on the Denver Broncos Super Bowl XXXII roster following the 1997 NFL season.

References

External links
Pro-Football reference

1973 births
Living people
Sportspeople from Lincoln, Nebraska
Players of American football from Nebraska
American football linebackers
Nebraska Cornhuskers football players
Jacksonville Jaguars players
Denver Broncos players
St. Louis Rams players
Scottish Claymores players